Long Grove is a city in Scott County, Iowa, United States. The population was 838 at the time of the 2020 census.

Geography
Long Grove is located at  (41.696806, −90.584974).

Education 
Long Grove is part of the North Scott Community School District, which spans  in northern Scott County.  Elementary-aged students from the city and adjoining nearby areas attend Alan Shepard Elementary. Junior high and high school students attend the North Scott Junior High and North Scott High School located in Eldridge.

Culture 
The town's annual celebration represents Long Grove's claim to fame: The Strawberry Festival. Held the second Sunday each June, the day kicks off at 9 am with the Strawberry Stampede – youth fun/competitive fitness footraces followed by a parade at 11:15 am. Area strawberry farmers sell strawberries, there are games for children, a children's Strawberry Pageant, Trivia Contest, Raffle, Strawberry Cooking Contest, petting zoo, pony rides, wagon rides, and a variety of entertainment groups throughout the day. Community organizations provide a wide variety of food choices. Strawberry shortcake, ice cream, kettle corn and other foods are available throughout the day.

Another attraction is the Alexander Brownlie Sod House, on the city's north side. The sod house was built by the Brownlie Brothers dates from Iowa's prairie days of the 1830s. The house, which is open for tours, is listed on the National Register of Historic Places.

Located approximately six miles north and east of Long Grove is the Dan Nagle Walnut Grove Pioneer Village, at the north edge of Scott County Park. The village, a re-creation of an 1860s Scott County cross-roads settlement and stage coach, is made up of 18 historic buildings including an old church, a bank, a train depot and boardwalk of shops. Numerous events are scheduled throughout the year.

Scott County Park is a  county park that offers numerous amenities and camping facilities.

Organizations include the Lion Grove Lions Club, the Long Grove Civic League, the Long Grove Sportsman's Club and the Cub Scouts.

Government 
Long Grove has a mayor-council form of government, and meets on the second Tuesday of each month at city hall. The city also has fire and police protection.

Also representing city interests are:
 Plan and Zone Commission, which meets on the third Monday of each month.

History 

Long Grove derives its name from the long, narrow strip of timber, which stretched from Walnut Grove (northeast of where Scott County Park now lies) to Allens Grove, several miles to the northwest.

Alexander and James Brownlie came to the area in August 1838, having followed the Mississippi River to the mouth of the Wapsipinicon River, then west along its banks. The two purchased a nearby timber ridge from a man named coats, settling the claim for $160 plus timberland and all the prairie they wished to own. The first log cabin was built shortly thereafter, in a cluster of trees at the east edge of the timber, just south of the original townsite.

A stage road, from Davenport to DeWitt and Dubuque passed through the village and a blacksmith shop and harness shop once lined the streets.

In the late 1860s, the railroad was extended from Davenport to Long Grove and stopped at what was originally known as Noel Station, in honor of John T. Noel, pioneer, township trustee and civil servant. The town, which had not been platted, was finally platted in the 1890s, though on a very loose basis.

A major incident in the city's history took place in December 1921, with the robbery of the Stockman's Savings Bank. Stories varied on what transpired, but what is known is that the two suspects were killed by a posse immediately after they attempted to hold up the bank.

The city remained a quiet farming community for many years, but has seen growth in the past 35 years. Along with the opening of Alan Shepard Elementary School, many new homes have been built on all four sides of the city.

Churches 

Churches located in or near Long Grove are:
 Long Grove Christian Church.
 St. Ann's Catholic Church, two miles (3 km) north of the city limits.

Demographics

2010 census
As of the census of 2010, there were 808 people, 281 households, and 244 families living in the city. The racial makeup of the city was 97.8% White, 0.2% Asian, 0.2% Pacific Islander, 0.2% from other races, and 1.5% from two or more races. Hispanic or Latino of any race were 3.3% of the population.

There were 281 households, of which 41.6% had children under the age of 18 living with them, 76.2% were married couples living together, 6.4% had a female householder with no husband present, 4.3% had a male householder with no wife present, and 13.2% were non-families. 11.4% of all households were made up of individuals, and 3.9% had someone living alone who was 65 years of age or older. The average household size was 2.88 and the average family size was 3.10.

The median age in the city was 41.1 years. 28.6% of residents were under the age of 18; 7.1% were between the ages of 18 and 24; 22.3% were from 25 to 44; 32.2% were from 45 to 64; and 9.7% were 65 years of age or older. The gender makeup of the city was 51.0% male and 49.0% female.

2000 census
As of the census of 2000, there were 597 people, 205 households, and 175 families living in the city. The racial makeup of the city was 99.66% White, and 0.34% from two or more races. Hispanic or Latino of any race were 0.17% of the population.

There were 205 households, out of which 46.8% had children under the age of 18 living with them, 78.5% were married couples living together, 6.8% had a female householder with no husband present, and 14.6% were non-families. 12.2% of all households were made up of individuals, and 4.4% had someone living alone who was 65 years of age or older. The average household size was 2.91 and the average family size was 3.18.

31.2% were under the age of 18, 5.2% from 18 to 24, 28.6% from 25 to 44, 28.1% from 45 to 64, and 6.9% were 65 years of age or older. The median age was 38 years. For every 100 females, there were 102.4 males. For every 100 females age 18 and over, there were 104.5 males.

The median income for a household in the city was $65,250, and the median income for a family was $68,125. Males had a median income of $44,821 versus $30,156 for females. The per capita income for the city was $23,041. About 1.3% of families and 2.1% of the population were below the poverty line, including 0.5% of those under age 18 and 8.0% of those age 65 or over.

Notable people

 Georges Le Marinel (1860–1914), American-born officer in the Belgian army, engineer, explorer and colonial administrator
 Paul Le Marinel, (1858–1912), brother of Georges, American-born officer in the Belgian army who became an explorer and administrator in the Congo Free State

References

External links

 City website

Cities in Iowa
Cities in Scott County, Iowa
Cities in the Quad Cities
Populated places established in 1838
1838 establishments in Iowa Territory